"Dream Brother" is the last track on the original release of Jeff Buckley's album Grace, the penultimate on later releases of the album. Written by Buckley, bassist Mick Grøndahl and drummer Matt Johnson, it was written as an urge for a friend of his, Chris Dowd of Fishbone fame, to not to walk out on his pregnant girlfriend in a similar way to Buckley's own father, Tim Buckley, as evidenced in the verses, "Don't be like the one who made me so old/Don't be like the one who left behind his name/'Cause they're waiting for you like I waited for mine/And nobody ever came".

Jeff Buckley notes:

The title was also used for a biography of Jeff and Tim Buckley, written posthumously by journalist David Browne, as well as an album featuring covers of some of their most famous by several artists including The Magic Numbers and Sufjan Stevens.

The song was covered by English progressive metal band TesseracT on their "Perspective EP".

Notes

Jeff Buckley songs
1994 songs
Songs written by Jeff Buckley

Brad Mehldau l'a reprise également en live.